Anathallis trullilabia is a species of orchid plant native to Brazil.

References 

trullilabia
Flora of Brazil